Amalou Ighriben is a town and eastern suburb of Khenifra in Khénifra Province, Béni Mellal-Khénifra, Morocco. According to the 2004 census it has a population of 28,933.

Demographics

References

Populated places in Khénifra Province